The men's 4 × 110 yards relay at the 1962 British Empire and Commonwealth Games, part of the athletics programme, was held at the Perry Lakes Stadium on Saturday 1 December 1962.

Nine nations competed in two heats in the first round, with the top three from each heat qualifying for the final. 

The event was won English team of Peter Radford, Len Carter, Alf Meakin and David Jones. They finished ahead of Ghanaian team of Michael Ahey, Bonner Mends, Bukari Bashiru and Michael Okantey and the Welsh quartet of David England, Ron Jones, Berwyn Jones and Nick Whitehead who won bronze. The winning time of 40.6 seconds was posted by both England and Ghana, with both team setting a new games record. The time also equalled the British record.

During the first change between Bob Lay and Dennis Tipping, the baton was dropped and Australians failed to recover, crossing the line in last place. The Sarawak team, who had originally finished 5th in 43.9 seconds were later disqualified.

Records

Round 1

Heat 1

Heat 2

Final

References

Men's 4 × 110 yards relay
1962